Donald Frederick Barber (born December 2, 1964) is a Canadian former professional National Hockey League forward. He played in 115 games with the Minnesota North Stars, Winnipeg Jets, Quebec Nordiques, and San Jose Sharks. He scored 25 goals and 32 assists. His son, Riley Barber, was drafted by the Washington Capitals in the 2012 NHL Entry Draft.

Career statistics

Awards and honours

References

External links
 

1964 births
Living people
Canadian ice hockey forwards
Bowling Green Falcons men's ice hockey players
Edmonton Oilers draft picks
Halifax Citadels players
Kansas City Blades players
Kelowna Buckaroos players
Sportspeople from Victoria, British Columbia
Minnesota North Stars players
Moncton Hawks players
Quebec Nordiques players
San Jose Sharks players
St. Albert Saints players
Winnipeg Jets (1979–1996) players
Ice hockey people from British Columbia